The Arkansas-class monitors were the last class of four monitors ordered for the U.S. Navy.

Design

Single turreted monitors, these ships mounted the most modern heavy guns in the US Navy at the time they were built, /40 caliber guns. The Arkansas-class monitors did not see any combat during World War I and instead served as submarine tenders. Alexander C. Brown, writing in the Society of Naval Architects and Marine Engineers Historical Transactions noted in a penetrating comment that:

They were manned by a total crew of 13 officers and 209 men.

Arkansas were powered by two vertical triple expansion engines driving two screw propellers with steam generated by four steam boilers.

The ships were armed with a main battery of two 12-inch/40 caliber guns, either Mark 3 or Mark 4, in a Mark 4 turret. The secondary battery consisted of four /50 caliber Mark 7 guns along with three 6-pounder  guns. The Arkansas also had a  deck.

Construction 
In response to increasing public pressure regarding the state of the nation's coastal defense forces and hastened by the outbreak of war with Spain, the U.S. Congress passed the Naval Appropriations Act of 1898on May 4th, which, among many other things, authorized the appropriation of 5 million dollars to build four new Monitors, each of which were to cost no more than $1,250,000. The new ships, created for harbor defense, were designed by Chief constructor Philip Hichborn with the original plans calling for a length of 225ft and a beam of 50ft, with a displacement of 2700 tons, a coal capacity of 200 tons, and a side armor belt of 11-inch thickness. For armament, the ship was to be equipped with a main battery containing a single turret with two 12-inch guns (Hichborn balanced), and four rapid-fire breech-loading rifles, with a secondary battery consisting of three 6-pound and four 1-pound rifles. Powered by two vertical triple-expansion type engines and twin-screw propellers, the ship would have a maximum speed of 12 knots.

Contractors 
Bidding began for the construction of the new monitors on October 1st, with the following results, including price:

 USS Arkansas - Newport News Shipping & Dry Dock Company - $860,000
 USS Connecticut - Bath Iron Works - $862,000
 USS Florida - Crescent Shipyard - $825,000
 USS Wyoming - Union Iron Works - $875,000

Following the bidding, the Navy announced the names of the ships.

Criticism and Proposed Redesign 
The new Monitors were met with criticism by many, as their design and armament made them no greater than any of the older navy Monitors, such as the Monterey, Monadnock, and Terror. The main complaint was the single turret, rather than a two-turret design as seen on the USS Terror. There were also those that argued that the entire building of four ships was a waste of money, as the monitors that participated in the Spanish-American War were met with considerable criticism, most chiefly from Rear Admiral William T. Sampson who criticized the slowness of the vessels and their firing accuracy. 

In response to these criticisms, Secretary of the Navy John D. Long ordered that all construction on the new vessels be halted while the Bureau of Naval Construction met to decide on changes in early November. Lewis Nixon of the Crescent Shipyard, the contractors of the USS Florida, submitted a new design for the Monitors which the Navy appears to have favored. The final proposed changes included the following:

 Replacing the single turret of two 12-inch guns with two turrets of two 10-inch guns in each 
 Increasing the maximum displacement from 2700 tons to 4000 tons 
 Increase the coal capacity from 200 tons to 400 tons 
 Lengthening the vessels by 30ft 

The Navy was confident that changes could be made to the design within the $1.25 million dollar budget set by Congress as they were surprised at how low the bids were for the four ships, with the highest contract, costing $875,000, leaving a minimum of $350,000 left over for each ship. The four ships were originally contracted at a price of $3,422,000 altogether. Throughout November the Bureau and shipbuilders discussed possible design changes, with the shipbuilders stating that their proposed changes would still go over the budget set by the Naval Apportions Act. Eventually, the two sides came to an agreement, which included the following:

 Retention of the single turret with two 12-inch guns
 Increased displacement by over 500 tons
 Increased coal capacity
 Lengthening the vessels from 225ft to 255ft

In the end, the most prominent point of contention, the main armament, was kept the same with the Navy receiving, on paper, most of what they wanted asides from that. Due to the new changes, the contract place of all monitors were increased by $100,000.

Armor 
As November drew to a close, it was reported that the new Monitors would be armored with Krupp Steel, which would be a first for a vessel in the U.S. Navy. However, Congress only authorized a maximum payment of $400 dollars a ton for armor, a price that was too low to purchase Krupp Steel. In June the Navy would instead outfit the ships with Harvey armor instead, which they purchased from both Carnegie Steel and Bethlehem Ironworks. Contracts for this armor were made in August and September 1899, totaling 2,152 tons. The armor was of great want to the Navy in a timely manner and did not wish to have any delays.

Connecticut Renaming 
The same year it was launched, Connecticut would undergo a change that had been lobbied for since 1898, though not in its design but rather its name. The state of Connecticut protested that a small monitor was named after the state rather than a Battleship, as had been the case with Rhode Island. The Navy eventually relented, and the name was removed, with the former Connecticut being referred to as "Monitor No. 8" until another candidate was chosen. Oklahoma and Arizona both offered up their names before it eventually went to Nevada.

Launch and Commissioning 
Construction progressed throughout the remainder of the 19th century and in the fall of 1900, Wyoming, Arkansas, and Nevada were launched, with Florida following a year later. All Arkansas-Class Monitors were commissioned by the summer of 1903.

Ships of the Arkansas-Class

Notes

Bibliography

External links 

World Battleships List: US "New Navy" Monitors

Monitor classes